Acadia is a neighbourhood in the southeast quadrant of Calgary, Alberta. The area is bounded on the west by Macleod Trail, on the east by the Bow River, on the north by Heritage Drive and on the south by Southland Drive.

The land was annexed to the City of Calgary in 1956, and Acadia was established in 1960.

The neighbourhood's main street is Fairmount Drive, and many of the area's businesses cluster along the street. The area also contains Lord Beaverbrook High School, the city's largest high school.

Demographics

Residents in this community had a median household income of $46,089 in 2000, and there were 19.2% low income residents living in the neighbourhood. As of 2000, 19.4% of the residents were immigrants. A proportion of 38.8% of the buildings were condominiums or apartments, and 38.9% were used for renting.

Education

The following schools are located in Acadia:

Public schools:
Acadia Elementary
Alice M. Curtis Elementary - Public
Andrew Davison Bilingual Elementary - Public
David Thompson Junior High - Public
Ecole de la Source - Francophone
Fred Parker Elementary
Lord Beaverbrook Senior High
Foundations for the Future
Catholic schools:
Ecole St. Cecilia Bilingual Elementary
Ecole St. Matthew Elementary & Junior High

Transit
Acadia is served by Calgary Transit Bus Route 99. The Heritage CTrain Station serves Acadia. Route 10 serves north and south via Fairmont Dr.

See also
List of neighbourhoods in Calgary

References

External links
  Acadia Community Association

Neighbourhoods in Calgary